Abhishekam (Telugu: అభిషేకం; translation: Anointing) is an Indian Telugu soap opera that airs on ETV (Telugu). It aired from Monday to Saturday initially during prime time and later shifted to afternoon. It premiered on 22 December 2008 and is the second longest running Indian television soap opera. The series went off air on 1 February 2022.

Plot

Abhishekam is a story of family relationships and human values.

Narasimham and Susheela have two children, Vinay and Sumathi. Vinay grows up hating his father because of Narasimham's alcoholism. Narasimham also harasses his wife on constant basis. Because of Narasimham Vijay's sister dies which causes Vinay to leave the house. He goes on to live with Mastaru (Eng translation Teacher) and his family in a village.

He stays with the family for twelve years during which Mastaru's daughter Rekha starts to love him. He rejects her love because of Rekha's grandmother who is against their union.

He becomes a software engineer and marries his boss's daughter Swathi.

One day he accidentally meets his mother and Mastaru. From whom he learns about critical health of Rekha. Urged by his mother and Mastaru he also marries Rekha to fulfill her last wish due to her critical status.

But to everyone's surprise Rekha recovers and comes to Vinay's home. How Vinay reacts to this and what decision he takes and how he deals with his wife Swathi in this regard forms the crux of the story.

Cast 

 Ravi Kiran
 Satish
 Mounica
 Sameera Sherief
 Chinna
 Ananya
 Saimantha
 Shyamala Devi
 Bangalore Padma
 Saimithra
 Dileep Teja
 Hari Teja
 Sainadh
 Kaushik
 Madhu Babu as Parvathaneni Harikrishna
 Vishnu Priya as Sirisha, Harikrishna's wife
 Kaaruna Bhushan as Subhadhra
 Sireesha Nulu as Archana
 Siddarth Varma
 Seetha Mahalakshmi
 Mirchi Madhavi
 Vandana Gollu as Subhadhra
 Priyanka as Haritha
 Varsha as Latha
 Seethamahalaxmi as Tulasi
 Pranay Hanumadla as Dev
 Hinduja Chowdary as Training Teacher
 Rohit Sahni as Pujari
 Jyothika Bobbili as Haritha
 Nawazshaan as Chakrapani
 Rupamuggalla as Latha
 Sridevi Kumrani as Sirisha's mother
 Priya Anand
 Sai Dharam Tej

Production
During the COVID-19 pandemic, the production of the serial was halted indefinitely on 19 March 2020 and the airing stopped after inadequate bank episodes from 27 March 2020. Production resumed after three months on mid June 2020 and new episodes started broadcasting from 22 June 2020.

See also 

 List of longest-running Indian television series

References

External links 

Telugu-language television shows
2008 Indian television series debuts
2010s Indian television series
Indian television soap operas
ETV Telugu original programming